Shenandoah Retreat is an unincorporated community and census-designated place in eastern Clarke County, Virginia, on the east shore of the Shenandoah River. The population as of the 2010 United States Census was 518.

References

Census-designated places in Clarke County, Virginia
Census-designated places in Virginia